Ali Canay (born 10 June 1955) is a Turkish boxer. He competed in the men's light flyweight event at the 1976 Summer Olympics.

References

1955 births
Living people
Turkish male boxers
Olympic boxers of Turkey
Boxers at the 1976 Summer Olympics
Place of birth missing (living people)
Light-flyweight boxers